"Electric Shock" is a song from South Korean girl group f(x). It was the lead single of their second extended play, Electric Shock, and was released in conjunction with the EP on June 10, 2012, for digital download and streaming via SM Entertainment. The accompanying music video was posted to SM's YouTube channel soon after the song's release. 

Commercially, "Electric Shock" reached the top three on the Gaon Digital Chart, K-pop Hot 100, and US World Digital Songs charts, the first time the group did so on the latter two charts. By the end of 2012, it garnered over 2,150,000 paid downloads in South Korea.

Composition
"Electric Shock" is an artpop and dance-pop song, employing elements of electro house. Lyrically, it is about expressing the feeling of love as an electric shock making the entire set about falling for another person and making a bond.

Reception 
Commercially, "Electric Shock" peaked at number one on the Gaon Digital Chart and the component digital download chart, selling 630,510 paid downloads in its first week. It then fell to number three and received 285,501 downloads the following week. After three weeks on the chart, "Electric Shock" garnered a total of 1,121,472 downloads. It was ranked the 35th best-selling song of 2012 in the country, with a cumulative total of 2,150,840 downloads.

Music video
An official 26-second teaser was released June 8, 2012. Another minute and a half extended teaser was aired on KBS World.The music video was officially released on June 12, 2012. The music video garnered more than one million views in less than a day and over 10 million views in less than a week. On October 16, 2016, the video surpassed 100 million views, making f(x) the 6th K-pop group and 3rd K-pop girl group to join the exclusive "100 million club."

The music video shows f(x) dancing to choreography by Jillian Meyers, who had previously worked with f(x) on their hit single, "Pinocchio (Danger)", and would soon work again with "Rum Pum Pum Pum". It features three sets, one pink set with running neon lights similar to a computer chip, one long white room with large white lights and reflective surfaces, and another white room with floor-to-ceiling windows. A total of 4 different sets of outfits can be seen on all five members. Throughout the video, the camera focuses back and forth between the dance number and close ups of each f(x) girl. In certain shots, each girl can be seen holding a specific electroshock weapon and directing it towards the camera: Krystal and Amber use tasers; Victoria and Luna use a stun baton; and Sulli uses a defibrillator.

Accolades

Charts

Weekly charts

Year-end charts

Credits 
Credits adapted from EP's liner notes.

Studio 
 Ingrid Studio – recording, digital editing
 SM Concert Hall Studio – mixing
 Sonic Korea – mastering

Personnel 

 SM Entertainment – executive producer
 Lee Soo-man – producer
 f(x) – vocals, background vocals
 Joachim Vermeulen Windsant – composition, arrangement 
 Maarten ten Hove – composition, arrangement
 Willem Laseroms – composition, arrangement
 Seo Ji-eum – lyrics
 Misfit – vocal directing, background vocals
 Jung Eun-kyung – recording, digital editing
 Kim Ji-eun – recording
 Nam Koong-jin – mixing
 Jeon Hoon – mastering

References

External links
 Electric Shock MV on YouTube
 Highlight medley on YouTube

F(x) (group) songs
2012 singles
Electropop songs
Dance-pop songs
Korean-language songs
SM Entertainment singles
2012 songs